Nam Hyun-joon (born 30 January 1979), often referred to as Poppin' Hyun Joon, is a South Korean dancer, rapper and singer. Best known for his popping techniques, he is considered a pioneer of South Korean breakdancing.

Biography
Nam Hyun-joon is famous for his explosive popping moves including:ticking, animation, tutting, and gliding.  He is considered to be one of the most well-known poppin dancers worldwide breakdance leagues.  Due to his well-known dancing abilities, he often trains stars and hired as a dance choreographer.  He has been in several dance groups, including Cyborg G, FREEZE, and Newest35.

Hyun-joon married Korean folk singer Park Aeri in December 2010. He came back September 2015 in six years.

Fame
Following the disbandment of Young Turks Club, Hyun-joon made the decision to pursue professional dancing.  His skill and smooth moves gained recognition from many Korean celebrities, most notably V.O.S member Choi Hyun-joon. Hyun-joon is influenced by the dance group Seo Taiji and Boys and was eventually featured in the music video "Amen" by Lee Juno.

Hyun-joon released a song titled 'Lion's Roar' in 2005 which lyrically describes his hardship and determination for dance.  He steadily gained popularity in Korea during this time and performed at the 2006 FIFA World Cup.  He is involved in a dance group called Nam Hyun-joon and Kids, which is a play on the name Seo Taiji and Boys.

Following the success of his previous single, Hyun-joon released his first hip-hop album, One & Only, in 2007. A music video for the lead single, "Don't Stop", was released and the song was promoted on televised music shows.

In late 2014 Hyun Joon won the National Creative-Economy Award for his artist entrepreneur company Poppin HyunJoon Art Company (PAC) and often appears in mainstream TV with his wife Park Aeri to promote the fusion combination of Arirang and Poppin.

On 31 July 2014, it was announced that Nam Hyun-joon had parted ways with Star Empire Entertainment for Happy Face Entertainment.

Filmography

Films
 Fly, Daddy, Fly (2006)
 Kung Fu Hip Hop (2008)
 The Wrath of Vajra (2013)

Dramas
 Over the Rainbow (2006)
 Poppin Hyun Joon – Poppin Dance Lecture (2007)
 Kungfu hip hop (2008)

Variety show
 King of Mask Singer (2020, MBC)

Discography

Singles
 Don't Stop (2005)

Albums

Award and nominations

References

External links

1979 births
K-pop singers
Living people
Popping dancers
Hanlim Multi Art School alumni
South Korean male film actors
Rappers from Seoul
Male actors from Seoul
South Korean male television actors
21st-century South Korean male singers
Singers from Seoul